Peter of Navarre may refer to:

Peter I of Aragon and Pamplona, king of Navarre from 1094 until 1104
Peter of Atarrabia, Franciscan provincial minister of Aragon from 1317 until 1346
Pedro, Marshal of Navarre (d. 1522)